Padín is a Spanish surname. Notable people with this surname include:

 Antonia Pérez Padín, Spanish feminist
 Cândido Rubens Padín (1915–2008), Brazilian bishop
 Laura Alonso Padín (born 1976), Spanish operatic soprano
 Margarita Padín (1910–1993), Argentinian stage and film actress
 María Padín (1888–1970), Uruguayan actress
 Ramón Allende Padín (1845–1884), Chilean physician

See also
 Padin (disambiguation)

Spanish-language surnames
Galician-language surnames